Plamena Mangova (born in Pleven, 1980) is a Bulgarian pianist.

Plamena Mangova studied with Marina Kapatsinskaya at the State Music Academy in Sofia. She went on to study with Dmitri Bashkirov at the Reina Sofía School of Music in Madrid, and with Abdel Rahman El Bacha at the Queen Elisabeth Music Chapel. 

At 18 she was awarded the XIV Paloma O'Shea Santander International Piano Competition's 3rd prize. Nine years later she took part at the XVI Queen Elisabeth International Music Competition, where she was second to Anna Vinnitskaya.

She has been active as a concert pianist at an international level since 2000, when she debuted at Paris' Théâtre du Châtelet. Her first CD, a Dmitri Shostakovich monographic, was awarded a Diapason d'Or. As a chamber musician she has recorded Sergey Prokofiev's complete works for violin and piano, plus Shostakovich's Piano Quintet, featured in the aforementioned recording.

Recording of Beethoven's Appassionata were used in Fargo, Season 3: https://www.tunefind.com/artist/plamena-mangova

References 

 Dutch Wikipedia
 Queen Elisabeth International Music Competition of Belgium
 Paloma O'Shea Santander International Piano Competition in Spain
 Ayuntamiento de Logroño

1980 births
Living people
Bulgarian classical pianists
Women classical pianists
Musicians from Pleven
Reina Sofía School of Music alumni
Prize-winners of the Paloma O'Shea International Piano Competition
Prize-winners of the Queen Elisabeth Competition
21st-century classical pianists